Sarvadhikari is a 1951 Indian Tamil-language musical film starring M. G. Ramachandran and Anjali Devi, with M. N. Nambiar as the antagonist. It established Nambiar as a major star. It was the 25th film for MGR.  It ran more than 100 days in Chennai and major cities and maximum run at Trichy – 141 days. With this film actress T. P. Muthulakshmi established herself as comedian and supporting actress. This film is based on American film The Gallant Blade. The film was dubbed in Telugu under the same title.

Plot 
An ambitious minister (Mahavarman) with designs to topple the puppet king (Pulimoottai Ramaswami) of Manipuri finds the popularity of the commander-in-chief (Ugrasenar) and his bodyguard (Pratapan) a stumbling block. He sends a young woman (Meena Devi) to seduce Pratapan, but she falls in love with him. After several twists and turns, Mahavarman is exposed and felled in an exciting duel with Pratapan. Ugrasenar is chosen as the first president while Pratapan is appointed as the new commander in chief. The kingdom of Manipuri is now a republic.

Cast 
Cast according to the opening credits of the film

Male cast
 M. G. Ramachandar as Prathapan
 V. Nagayya as Ugrasenar
 M. N. Nambiar as Mahavarman
 Pulimoottai Ramasami as King
 A. Karunanidhi as Vairagyam
 S. M. Thirupathisami
 V. K. Ramasamy as Baladev
 S. S. Sivasooriyan
 K. K. Soundar as Mohan
 M. A. Chinnappa

Female cast
 Anjali Devi as Meena Devi
 M. Saroja as Karpagam
 Jayalakshmi
 S. R. Janaki
 Angamuthu
 Muthulakshmi as Pooncholai 
Dance
 Kumari Kamala

Soundtrack 
The music composed by S. Dakshinamurthi.

All the tunes for all the songs for both languages are the same.

Tamil Songs
Lyrics were by Ka. Mu. Sheriff, A. Maruthakasi & K. P. Kamatchi Sundharam. Playback singers are Thiruchi Loganathan, T. M. Soundararajan, S. Dakshinamurthi, P. A. Periyanayaki, P. Leela and U. R. Chandra.

Sarvadhikari Telugu Songs
Playback singers are Thiruchi Loganathan, T. M. Soundararajan, S. Dakshinamurthi and P. Leela.

References

External links 
 

1950s Tamil-language films
1951 films
1951 musical films
Films scored by Susarla Dakshinamurthi
Indian multilingual films
Indian musical films